Devils Lake is a lake in the Otter Tail County in Minnesota. The lake occupies  in size.

The lake is a locally popular fishing spot. The lake is mesotrophic.

References

Lakes of Otter Tail County, Minnesota
Lakes of Minnesota